Samurai Rabbit: The Usagi Chronicles is a CGI-animated action-comedy streaming television series developed by Doug and Candie Langdale. The show is loosely based on the Usagi Yojimbo comic books by Stan Sakai. Unlike its source material where the comics takes place in the past, the show takes place in the future and Miyamoto Usagi is not the lead protagonist.

Produced by Netflix Animation, Atomic Monster Productions, Dark Horse Entertainment and Gaumont Animation, the series premiered on April 28, 2022, on Netflix. A second season was released on September 1, 2022.

Synopsis
Samurai Rabbit: The Usagi Chronicles takes place in the far future and centers on rabbit teenager Yuichi, who is the descendant of Miyamoto Usagi, and his group of eccentric companions (Gen, Kitsune and Chizu) while defending the city of Neo Edo from the menace of Kagehito and the Yokai.

Voice cast
 Darren Barnet as Yuichi Usagi and Spot
 Aleks Le as Gen
 Shelby Rabara as Kitsune, Mayumi, and Kiyoko
 Mallory Low as Chizu and Jihanki
 SungWon Cho as Lord Kogane, Warimashi, and Head Keisatsukan
 Eric Bauza as Kagehito, Chikabuma/Mechabuma, Admiral Nochi, O-Dokuro, and Yabushito
 Mela Lee as Lady Fuwa, Kaiyo, Toshiko, Fumiko, Hana, Kana, Warbotto, and Sawaguchi
 Keone Young as Tetsujin, Hakai, and Keisatsu
 Sumalee Montano as Karasu-Tengu and Auntie
 Yuki Matsuzaki as Miyamoto Usagi

Episodes

Season 1 (2022)

Season 2 (2022)

Production
The series was first announced in February 2018 that a CGI adaptation of the comics is in the works from Gaumont Animation. In mid-July 2020, Gaumont stated that the adaptation will be a series on Netflix under the title Samurai Rabbit: The Usagi Chronicles, in partnership with Netflix Animation. Production companies Atomic Monster Productions and Dark Horse Entertainment are also involved with the series, with Mumbai-based studio 88 Pictures handling the CGI animation. Khang Le serves as art director.

Doug and Candie Langdale serve as show-runners as well as executive producers. At the virtual Comic-Con@Home event in July 2021, the show's main voice cast was revealed with Darren Barnet in the lead role of Yuichi Usagi. In April 2022, Yuki Matsuzaki announced that he would be reprising his role as Miyamoto Usagi; he previously voiced the character in the 2012 iteration of the Teenage Mutant Ninja Turtles animated series.

Release
Samurai Rabbit: The Usagi Chronicles was released on April 28, 2022, on Netflix. A trailer was released on April 1.

References

External links

2022 American television series debuts
2020s American animated television series
2022 French television series debuts
2020s French animated television series
American children's animated action television series
American children's animated comedy television series
American computer-animated television series
Animated series based on comics
Animated television series about animals
Animated television series about rabbits and hares
Anime-influenced Western animated television series
English-language Netflix original programming
French children's animated action television series
French children's animated comedy television series
Japan in non-Japanese culture
French computer-animated television series
Gaumont Animation
Netflix children's programming
Teen animated television series
Television series by Netflix Animation
Television series set in the 26th century
Television series set in the future
Television shows based on Dark Horse Comics
Yōkai in popular culture
Usagi Yojimbo